Hamza Agrebi (born 21 March 1991) is a Tunisian football defender.

References

1991 births
Living people
Tunisian footballers
Tunisia international footballers
Club Africain players
Association football defenders
Tunisian Ligue Professionnelle 1 players